Liesek is a village and municipality in Tvrdošín District in the Žilina Region of northern Slovakia.

History
In historical records the village was first mentioned in 1558.

Geography
The municipality lies at an altitude of 631 metres and covers an area of 30.904 km². It has a population of about 2,595 people.

Church
The Baroque church of Saint Michael Archangel, consecrated at 1818, has been extended in 1996–97. The extension initiated by the parish priest Stefan Koma is a unique blend of the Baroque and modern functionalist style.

Villages and municipalities in Tvrdošín District